Liina Triškina-Vanhatalo ( Liina Triškina; born on 2 June 1976 in Pärnu) is an Estonian film director, scenarist and editor.

She is working mainly for the production studios Allfilm and Vesilind.

Filmography

 2012 	"40+2 nädalat" (documentary film; scenarist and operator)
 2013 	"Tulekahju paine" (documentary film; scenarist)
 2014 	"Maastiku mustrid" (documentary film; scenarist)
 2015 	"Emajõe veemaailm" (documentary film; scenarist)
 2018 	"Võta või jäta" ('Take It or Leave It') (documentary film; director and scenarist)

References

Living people
1976 births
Estonian film directors
Estonian screenwriters
People from Pärnu